Rich International Airways was primarily a United States charter and cargo airline founded by aviation pioneer Jean Rich, one of the few women in the U.S. to own and operate an airline. The air carrier was based in Miami, Florida. The airline ceased operations in 1996, following bankruptcy.

History

Rich International Airways was founded as a cargo airline in 1969, flying Curtiss C-46 Commando and Beechcraft Model 18 aircraft to the Caribbean.  Capacity was steadily increased with the addition of Douglas DC-6 and Douglas DC-8-60 freighters.

In 1982, the carrier was granted permission to fly passenger charters, and began operations to Europe and Hawaii.  However, losses from the expansion forced the company to seek Chapter 11 bankruptcy in 1983. This was followed by scrutiny from the Federal Aviation Administration, which revoked the airline's operating license due to maintenance irregularities during the DOT “white glove inspections” directed by the Hon. Elizabeth Dole in the spring of 1984. The FAA agreed to return the operating certificate with the addition of new key personnel, Director of Operations, Chief Pilot, Director of Maintenance and Director of Training.

Following the restart and new operating approvals, Miami-based George E. Batchelor invested in the company, and by 1991, Rich had successfully exited bankruptcy protection. This period of prosperity was accompanied by more expansion, including the introduction of the wide-body Lockheed L-1011 TriStar for flights to Europe.  According to the Official Airline Guide (OAG), in the spring of 1996 Rich was operating scheduled passenger service with L-1011 aircraft nonstop twice a week between Anchorage (ANC) and Honolulu (HNL).

In the wake of the crash of ValuJet Flight 592 in the Everglades, much media attention was given to the FAA's poor oversight of the ValuJet's rapid, unsustainable growth and multiple safety violations. The FAA then grounded Rich for alleged maintenance irregularities. Operations ceased on September 1, 1996. The US aviation authority FAA wanted to allow flight operations until February 1997, but the US Department of Transportation refused to approve and made a license dependent on numerous conditions. In February 1997, Rich International announced its bankruptcy and was dissolved. It was no longer able to meet the requirements of the Ministry of Transport economically. The aircraft and the entire inventory were auctioned in July 1997.

The following year, the FAA released findings stating that the grounding of Rich may have been an overreaction, and that minor maintenance issues may have been blown out of proportion in the public hysteria following the ValuJet crash.

Fleet

The Rich International Airways fleet consisted of the following aircraft:

Accidents and incidents
February 28, 1994, during takeoff at  Fairbanks International Airport for a ferry flight to Miami, a Lockheed L-1011-1 Tristar (registered N303EA) experienced a mechanical power loss on the number 3 and number 1 engines and an internal fire on the number 1 engine. The takeoff was aborted and during the taxi back, the fire on the number 1 engine was extinguished. None of the 3 occupants on board were injured.

See also
 List of defunct airlines of the United States

References

Citations

Bibliography

External links

Fleet and Code data
Airliners.net photos

Defunct airlines of the United States
Airlines established in 1969
Airlines disestablished in 1997
Companies based in Miami
Defunct companies based in Florida